Bani Yousef is a sub-district located in Far Al Udayn District, Ibb Governorate, Yemen. Bani Yousef had a population of 6604 according to the 2004 census.

References 

Sub-districts in Far Al Udayn District